Soundfly is an online music education platform based in Brooklyn, New York. They offer online music courses and mentorship sessions as well as hosting a bi-weekly podcast, Themes and Variation, and a daily blog, Flypaper.

The company was founded in 2015 by Ian Temple.

Courses 
In 2022, Soundfly has released courses on designing sample-based instruments with Son Lux's Ryan Lott, retrofuturistic, synth-based electronic music production with Com Truise, and rhythmic creativity with producer Jlin. Previously, in November 2021, Soundfly released a piano course covering music theory, improvisation, and beat making with pianist and producer Kiefer. Earlier that year, the company released a course on sampling and arranging with DJ and producer RJD2, which was filmed by RJD2 himself during the COVID-19 pandemic lockdown, and a course on vocal songwriting and production with pop singer Kimbra.

Previous courses have included the companion course for Carnegie Hall's Somewhere Project, as well as courses on synthesis, music production in Logic Pro and Ableton Live, music theory for producers, crowdfunding, beginner piano, and open tunings for guitar. They also produced a guide for how to learn things online at the outset of the coronavirus pandemic.

Notable Instructors 

 Ryan Lott
 Com Truise
 Jlin
 Kiefer
RJD2
 Kimbra
 Andrew Huang
 Kaki King
 Ari Herstand
 Marin Alsop
 Amanda Dehnert
 Ethan Hein of NYU's MusED Lab
 Grant Zubrinski (bassist for MS MR and Chet Faker)
 Alex Wilson of Sleepmakeswaves

References 

Internet properties established in 2015
American companies established in 2015
2015 establishments in New York City
Educational organizations established in 2015
Companies based in Brooklyn
Distance education institutions based in the United States
For-profit music schools in the United States